USS Aaron Ward (DD-483) was a  in the service of the United States Navy. She was the second Navy ship named in honor of Rear Admiral Aaron Ward. She sank on 7 April 1943 in a shoal near Tinete Point of Nggela Sule, Solomon Islands during Operation I-Go. Her wreck was discovered on 4 September 1994.

Construction 
Aaron Ward was laid down on 11 February 1941 at Kearny, New Jersey by the Federal Shipbuilding and Drydock Company and launched on 22 November 1941, sponsored by Miss Hilda Ward, the daughter of the late Admiral Ward. The ship was commissioned on 4 March 1942.

Service history 
Following her shakedown cruise out of Casco Bay, Maine and post-shakedown availability at the New York Navy Yard, Aaron Ward sailed for the Pacific on 20 May 1942 and proceeded via the Panama Canal to San Diego. A short time later, as the Battle of Midway was developing off to the westward, the destroyer operated in the screen of Vice Admiral William S. Pye's Task Force 1 (TF 1), built around four battleships and an escort carrier, as it steamed out into the Pacific Ocean – eventually reaching a point some 1,200 miles (2,200 km) west of San Francisco, California and equally northeast of Hawaii – to "support the current operations against the enemy." With the detachment of Long Island from the task force on 17 June, Aaron Ward screened her on her voyage back to San Diego.

World War II 
After local operations off the west coast, Aaron Ward sailed for Hawaii on 30 June 1942 and then to the Tonga Islands with TF 18. Assigned to escort duties soon afterwards, she convoyed the oiler  to Nouméa. During the course of the voyage she made two sound contacts, one on 5 August and the other the following day, which she developed and attacked with depth charges. Although she claimed a probable sinking in each case, neither kill was borne out in postwar accounting.

Within a month's time, Aaron Ward was earmarked for a shore bombardment mission on 17 October. She stood into Lunga Roads to lie to and await the arrival of a Marine liaison officer who would designate targets for the ship. Before she could embark passengers, though, she spotted five enemy bombers approaching from the west. These attacked Aaron Ward but ran into a heavy antiaircraft barrage from both the ship and marine guns on shore. The destroyer went ahead at flank speed when she spotted the attackers, to carry out evasive maneuvers and avoid the falling bombs, radically swinging to the right or left as the occasion demanded. Three bombs splashed  astern of the ship. The Marines claimed two of the five attackers destroyed, while the ship and the Marines shared a third kill.

The action over, the destroyer embarked Martin Clemens, the former British consular representative on Guadalcanal, Major C. M. Nees, USMC, and Corporal R. M. Howard, USMC, a photographer, and got underway soon afterwards, reaching her target area within 40 minutes. For three hours, Aaron Ward shelled Japanese shore positions, her targets ranging from a gun emplacement to ammunition dumps; fires, smoke, and explosions marked her visit as she quit the area. Reaching Lunga Roads, she disembarked her passengers and after going on alert for a Japanese air raid that failed to materialize, cleared Lengo Channel and rejoined her task force.

The destroyer went to the aid of the stricken cruiser and dropped a full depth charge pattern on Chesters assailant, but did not record a kill. She then escorted the damaged cruiser to Espiritu Santo.

Arriving off Lunga Point at 0520 on 30 October, the task group stood in, and Atlanta embarked a liaison officer from Major General Alexander A. Vandegrift, Commander of the 1st Marine Division, 20 minutes later.

Steaming to its designated area, the task group reached its destination within an hour's time, and Atlanta opened fire. Aaron Ward followed suit soon afterwards; eventually, she expended 711 rounds of 5-inch ammunition. Pausing briefly to investigate a reported submarine in the vicinity, Aaron Ward then cleared the area.

Naval Battle of Guadalcanal, 13 November 1942 
Aaron Ward screened transports unloading men and material off Guadalcanal on 11 and 12 November, shooting down one enemy plane and damaging two others on the former day and two more planes off Lunga Point on the latter. The Allies learned that the Japanese were sending a large force to disrupt air operations based at Henderson Field and land reinforcements for the Japanese forces on the island. The resulting Naval Battle of Guadalcanal proved to be the climactic engagement of the Guadalcanal campaign.

On the evening of 12 November, Aaron Ward retired with her task force – five cruisers and eight destroyers under Rear Admiral Daniel J. Callaghan – in an eastward direction, escorting the transports out of what would be come to be known after the battle as "Ironbottom Sound". Later, the force reversed course and stood back through Lengo Channel.

Aaron Ward, leading the four destroyers bringing up the rear of Callaghan's column, ranged in on the Japanese ships, opening fire soon afterwards on a target she took to be a battleship. A short time later, after the ship had fired approximately ten salvos, she saw that the cruisers ahead of her had apparently changed course; Aaron Ward observed two torpedoes pass beneath her.

Aaron Ward, with the waters clear ahead of her, surged ahead once more. Observing what she took to be  heading directly toward her port side, Aaron Ward put her rudder over hard to port to avoid a collision.

A short time later, the destroyer commenced firing on an enemy ship, and hurled some 25 salvos in her direction; her target may have been , which did blow up and sink, with very heavy loss of life. Changing course to bear on a new target in the melee, Aaron Ward managed to get off four salvos on director control until a Japanese shell put the director out of action and forced the destroyer's gunners to rely on local control.

In the minutes that followed, Aaron Ward received eight more direct hits; unable to identify friend from foe and certain that the enemy had surely established her American character, the destroyer then stood out to clear the area. She lost steering control at 0225, and, steering with her engines, attempted to come to the right. Seeing no more firing after 0230, when the battle apparently ended, Aaron Ward went dead in the water at 0235, her forward engine room flooded with salt water and her feed water gone.

Using a gasoline pump, the destroyer's crew managed to pump salt water into the tanks and light the boilers off. At 0500, Aaron Ward moved slowly ahead, bound for Sealark Channel; ten minutes later, American motor torpedo boats closed, and the destroyer signaled them to ask Tulagi for a tug. She kept up her crawling pace for only a half-hour before going dead in the water again.

Thirty minutes after she had slowed to a stop, Aaron Ward spotted the Japanese battleship Hiei steaming slowly in circles between Savo and Florida Islands. The destroyer s presence in the vicinity proved to be her own undoing: Portland summarily sank her.

Aaron Ward, perhaps prompted to do so with more urgency due to Hieis proximity, got underway at 0618, and two minutes later greeted tug , which had arrived to take the destroyer in tow. Before the towline could be rigged, Hiei spotted Aaron Ward and opened fire with her heavy guns. Four two-gun salvos were laid, the third of which straddled the crippled destroyer. However, planes sent from Henderson Field began attacking Hiei, distracting her from further fire.

Losing power again at 0635, Aaron Ward was taken in tow by Bobolink, and the ships began moving toward safety. The tug turned the tow over to a local patrol boat at 0650, and the destroyer anchored in Tulagi harbor near Makambo Island at 0830. The nine direct hits she had received resulted in 15 men dead and 57 wounded. After receiving temporary repairs locally, Aaron Ward sailed for Hawaii soon afterwards, reaching Pearl Harbor on 20 December 1942 for permanent repairs.

The destroyer rejoined the fleet on 6 February 1943 and soon resumed escort work. During one stint with a small convoy on 20 March, she aided in driving off attacking Japanese planes. On 7 April, she had escorted  and three tank landing craft from the Russell Islands to Savo. At about noon, the destroyer received notification of an impending air raid at Guadalcanal.

Sinking 

As the ships neared their destination, Aaron Ward received orders at about 1330 to leave her convoy to cover the tank landing ship LST-449 off Togoma Point, Guadalcanal. (One of the passengers on LST-449 was then Lieutenant (junior grade) John F. Kennedy, later to become President of the United States, on his way to take command of PT-109.) Joining LST-449 at 1419, the destroyer directed her to follow her movements and zigzag at the approach of enemy aircraft. While the LST maneuvered to conform to Aaron Wards movements, Lieutenant Commander Frederick J. Becton, commanding officer of Aaron Ward, planned to retire to the eastward through Lengo Channel, as other cargo ships and escorting ships were doing upon receipt of the air raid warning from Guadalcanal.

Sighting a dogfight over Savo Island, Aaron Ward tracked a closer group of Japanese planes heading south over Tulagi; while swinging to starboard, the ship suddenly sighted three enemy planes coming out of the sun. Surging ahead to flank speed and putting her rudder over hard to port, Aaron Ward opened fire with her 20 mm and 40 mm guns, followed shortly afterwards by her 5-inch battery. Bombs from the first three planes struck on or near the ship, and the mining effect of the near-misses proved devastating; the first bomb was a near miss, which tore holes in the side of the ship, allowing the forward fire room to take water rapidly; the second struck home in the engine room, causing a loss of all electrical power on the 5 inch and 40 mm mounts. Shifting to local control, however, the gunners kept up the fire. A third bomb splashed close aboard, holing her port side, near the after engine room. Having lost power to her rudder, the ship continued to swing to port as another trio of dive bombers loosed their loads on the now-helpless destroyer. While none of these bombs hit the ship, two landed very near her port side. Twenty men died, 59 were wounded, and seven went missing.

When it became evident that the battle to save Aaron Ward was being lost, Ortolan and Vireo attempted to beach her on a shoal near Tinete Point of Nggela Sule. At 21:35, however, Aaron Ward sank, stern-first, in 40 fathoms (70 m) of water, only  from shoal water.

Discovery 

On 4 September 1994, divers located the wreck of Aaron Ward. The first dive to the wreck was made on 25 September 1994. Because of the depth, divers were limited to about 15 minutes at the wreck before beginning their return to the surface.

Awards 
Aaron Ward was awarded four battle stars for her World War II service.

Notes

References

External links 

http://www.michaelmcfadyenscuba.info/viewpage.php?page_id=4
USS Aaron Ward website at Destroyer History Foundation
  NavSource: USS Aaron Ward
 Roll of Honor

 

World War II destroyers of the United States
Ships built in Kearny, New Jersey
Shipwrecks in Ironbottom Sound
1941 ships
Gleaves-class destroyers of the United States Navy
Destroyers sunk by aircraft
Wreck diving sites
Maritime incidents in April 1943
Ships sunk by Japanese aircraft
Underwater diving sites in the Solomon Islands